GMF AeroAsia (PT Garuda Maintenance Facility AeroAsia Tbk) is an Indonesian company that specialises in aircraft maintenance repair and overhaul. The company serves the Asia-Pacific region and employs more than 4,000 people, and is based in Tangerang, Indonesia, it  has many offices around the world. It services airplanes of many types and is one of the largest and leading aircraft maintenance facilities in Asia.

History

Before 2000 (millennium year)
The company was established in 1984 as Garuda Maintenance Facilities Support Center. In seven years, funded entirely by the Indonesian government, it had spent US$200 million, of which 63% was used to import hi-tech machinery and equipment. In 1996, it became a SBU changing its name to Garuda Maintenance Facilities AeroAsia, or GMF AeroAsia in short.

After 2000
In August 2002, it split off from PT Garuda Indonesia.

In January 2007, PT Garuda Indonesia announced it would sell a minority stake of GMF AeroAsia in April 2007. Other subsidiaries, PT Aerowisata, PT Abacus Distribution System and PT Gapura Angkasa would be sold completely as Garuda Indonesia does not consider them as "core business". GMF AeroAsia has recently concluded a restructuring as part of the company's strategic development visions embodied in ‘The Global Challenge’, a fifteen-year ‘voyage’ plan.

Currently, it is certified in many countries and serves many airlines. It has three partners; KLM Engineering & Maintenance, Swiss Air and Global Aviation USA
In September 2008, KLM attempted to buy shares in GMF, but were turned down. The intention is to release the shares publicly and KLM were told they were free to buy shares at that point. In 2009, GMF AeroAsia's biggest clients are parent Garuda followed by Lion Air, but as 2015, GMF AeroAsia's biggest clients are its parent company Garuda Indonesia with its low-cost arm Citilink followed by Sriwijaya Air. Lion Air itself as previous second biggest client of GMF already sets up their own maintenance repair and overhaul in Batam and now only uses GMF when unable to bring their aircraft to Batam.

Facilities

All of its facilities are at Soekarno-Hatta International Airport. They comprise 480,000 m2 of built-up structures, including four  hangars, a spares warehouse, workshops, utility buildings, ground support equipment building, chemical stores, engine test cell and management offices. In addition, GMF AeroAsia has an apron capable of handling up to 50 aircraft, taxiways, a run-up bay and a waste treatment area taking up a 1,150,000 m2 area.

Hangar 1 was built in 1991 designed for Boeing 747s, has two full docks and is 22,000 m2. It can perform Section 41 Modification, replace and strengthen body skin, frame stringer, intercostal and several selected structure in Nose Section 41 area. Hangar 2 is 23,000 m2 and has 5 aircraft bays. It can perform minor A and B checks. It can hold up to one narrow body and one wide body jet. Hangar 3 is 23,000 m2. It normally holds up to 7 narrow body aircraft, but can be reconfigured to hold up to one wide body and 6 narrow body. It has 7 bays with 4 full docks. It has 6 roof-mounted cranes and has one bay designed for McDonnell Douglas MD-11s, McDonnell Douglas DC-10s, and Airbus A330s. On September 28, 2015 Hangar 4 began operation with a capacity of 16 narrow-body aircraft on an 67,022 square-meter of land, making it the largest in the world, is equipped with a purpose-built docking platform for heavy maintenance of narrow body aircraft.

AeroAsia also provides certain assets of OEMs, located in a customs bonded area at Soekarno-Hatta International Airport. Customers can get anything from this storage warehouse with a computerized system. It uses this warehouse to provide asset management, inventory assistance, management services and trading aircraft parts.

Customers
From  which includes previous clients.

Worldwide

ACG Acquisition XX LLC, USA 
Aercap Group Services.Bu, Netherland
Aergo Capital, Ireland
AirAsia, Malaysia
Air Atlanta Icelandic, Iceland
Air China, People’s Republic of China
Air Quarius, South Africa
Aerospace Consortium FZE, UAE
Avient, England
Biman Airlines, Bangladesh
Cathay Pacific, Hong Kong
China Airlines, Taiwan R.O.C.
China Southern, China
Corsair Fly, France
EASAX, Nairobi 
Japan Airlines, Japan
Gatenick, UAE
GMG Airlines, Bangladesh
GECAS, USA
GLCW LLC, USA
Hellenic Imperial Airways, Greece
Hong Kong Express, Hong Kong
Iberworld, Spain
Jetlink Express LTD, Nairobi
Khors Air, Ukraine
Korean Airlines, Korea 
Kabo Air, Nigeria
KLM Royal Dutch Airlines, the Netherlands
Korean Airlines, Korea 
Logistic Air, USA
Macquaire Aircraft Leasing Service, Ireland 
Malaysia Airlines Berhad, Malaysia
Max Air, Nigeria
Midex, UAE
MK-Airlines, Uganda
Mytravel, United Kingdom
Nepal Airlines, Nepal
Nok Air, Thailand
Orient Thai Airlines, Thailand
Heavy Lift, Australia
Pakistan International Airlines, Pakistan
Phuket Airlines, Thailand
Pulmantur Air, Spain
Oman Air, Oman
Qantas, Australia
Royal Brunei Airlines, Brunei
Rayyan Air, Pakistan
Shenzhen Airlines, People’s Republic of China
The State of the Netherlands, the Netherlands
Sahara Airline, India
Saudi Arabian Airlines, Saudi Arabia
SIAEC, Singapore 
Safi Airways, United Arab Emirates 
Southern Air, United States of America
Spice Jet, India
Taxy Fly (Pron Air), Spain
Thomas Cook, England
Virgin Australia
Veteran Avia, UAE
Yemenia Airways, Yemen

Domestic

Cardig Air
Citilink
Sriwijaya Air
Garuda Indonesia
Lion Air
NAM Air
Pelita Air Service
Republic Express Airlines

Certification
From 

 Indonesia DGCA
 USA FAA
 Europe EASA
 Singapore CAAS
 Sudan CAA
 South Africa CAA
 Nigeria CAA
 Yemen CAMA
 Thailand DCA
 Papua New Guinea
 Ghana CAA
 Bangladesh CAA

References

Aircraft engineering companies
Aviation in Indonesia
Companies established in 1984
Garuda Indonesia
Privately held companies of Indonesia